The Compuserve Comics and Animation Forum's Don Thompson Awards (also known as the Thompsons) were given for achievement in comic books, comic strips, and animation. Initiated in 1992, they were originally known as the Compuserve Comics and Animation Forum Awards for the CompuServe forum that created and gave out the award. In 1994, after the death of long-time comics enthusiast and publisher Don Thompson, the awards were renamed in Thompson's honor. The final awards were presented in 1998.

Nominees were selected by Compuserve Comics Forum members, with write-in votes allowed; voting was open to Compuserve Comics Forum members. The awards were administered and presented annually at the Detroit-based multigenre convention Motor City Comic Con.

Categories 
Awards are for work done during the listed year.

Best Achievement by a Writer 
 1992 Neil Gaiman
 1993 Neil Gaiman
 1994 Neil Gaiman
 1995 Kurt Busiek
 1996 Kurt Busiek
 1997 Kurt Busiek
 1998 Warren Ellis

Best Achievement by a Penciller 
 1992 Tom Mandrake
 1993 Tom Mandrake
 1994 Chris Bachalo
 1995 Michael Zulli
 1996 Brent Anderson
 1997 George Pérez

Best Achievement by an Inker 
 1992 Gerhard
 1993 George Pérez
 1994 Mark Buckingham
 1995 Mike Mignola
 1996 George Pérez
 1997 Mark Farmer

Favorite Penciller/Inker or Penciller/Inker Team 
 1998 Bryan Hitch/Paul Neary

Best Achievement by a Painter 
 1992 Dave McKean
 1993 Alex Ross
 1994 Alex Ross
 1995 Alex Ross
 1996 Alex Ross
 1997 Alex Ross
 1998 Alex Ross

Best Achievement by a Letterer 
 1992 Todd Klein
 1993 Tom Orzechowski
 1994 Todd Klein
 1995 Todd Klein
 1996 Todd Klein
 1997 Todd Klein

Best Achievement by a Colorist 
 1992 Steve Oliff
 1993 Steve Oliff
 1994 Steve Oliff
 1995 Trish Mulvihill
 1996 Trish Mulvihill
 1997 Matt Hollingsworth
 1998 Matt Hollingsworth

Best Achievement by an Editor 
 1992 Karen Berger
 1993 Mike Carlin
 1994 tie:
 Karen Berger
 Dwayne McDuffie
 1995 Karen Berger
 1996 Fabian Nicieza
 1997 Archie Goodwin
 1998 Stuart Moore

Best Achievement by a Cover Artist 
 1992 Brian Bolland
 1993 Brian Bolland
 1994 Alex Ross
 1995 Alex Ross
 1996 Alex Ross
 1997 Alex Ross
 1998 Alex Ross

Best Achievement by a New Talent 
 1992 Joe Quesada
 1993 Alex Ross
 1994 Terry Moore
 1995 Paul Jenkins
 1996 Mark Crilley
 1997 Sean McKeever
 1998 Paul Storrie

Talent Most Deserving of Wider Recognition 
 1998 Brian Wood

Best Achievement by a Writer & Artist 
 1992 John Byrne
 1993 Jeff Smith
 1994 tie:
 Terry Moore
 Jeff Smith
 1995 David Lapham
 1996 Frank Miller
 1997 Batton Lash

Favorite Writer & Artist or Cartoonist (Drama) 
 1998 Frank Miller

Best Achievement by a Cartoonist 
 1996 tie:
 Sergio Aragonés
 Batton Lash

Favorite Individual Comic-Strip Creator or Creative Team 
 1998 Scott Adams

Favorite Individual Comic-Book Creator or Single Creative Team 
 1998 Kurt Busiek/Brent Anderson

Best Achievement by a Political Cartoonist 
 1992 Garry Trudeau
 1993 Garry Trudeau
 1994 Garry Trudeau
 1995 Garry Trudeau
 1996 Garry Trudeau

Best Long-Form Animation 
 1992 Aladdin
 1993 The Nightmare Before Christmas
 1994 The Lion King
 1995 Toy Story
 1996 Superman: Last Son of Krypton
 1997 Anastasia

Favorite Animated Film 
 1998 A Bug's Life

Best Short-Form/TV Animation 
 1992 Batman: The Animated Series
 1993 Batman: The Animated Series
 1994 The Tick
 1995 The Adventures of Batman & Robin
 1996 The Simpsons
 1997 The Simpsons

Favorite Animated TV Series 
 1998 The New Batman/Superman Adventures

Best Cover 
 1992 Spectre #2
 1993 Marvels #2
 1994 Marvels #3
 1995 Astro City #1
 1996 Kingdom Come #4
 1997 Astro City #9

Favorite Cover 
 1998 Preacher #40

Best Continuing Series 
 1992 The Sandman
 1993 The Sandman
 1994 The Sandman
 1995 Astro City
 1996 Astro City
 1997 Astro City

Favorite Ongoing Comic Book Series 
 1998 Transmetropolitan

Best Limited Series 
 1992 Gotham Nights
 1993 Marvels
 1994 Marvels
 1995 The Tale of One Bad Rat
 1996 Kingdom Come
 1997 The Kents

Favorite Limited Comic-Book Series 
 1998 Whiteout

Best New Series 
 1992 The Spectre
 1993 Static
 1994 Starman
 1995 Astro City
 1996 Leave It to Chance
 1997 Transmetropolitan

Favorite New Series 
 1998 Astounding Space Thrills

Most Improved Series 
 1992 X-Factor
 1993 The Flash
 1994 Legion of Super-Heroes & Legionnaires
 1995 Captain America
 1996 StormWatch
 1997 Captain America

Favorite Short Story (less than one standard issue in length) 
 1998: Desire, Batman 80-Page Giant #1

Best Single Issue 
 1992 X-Factor #87
 1993 The Sandman #50
 1994 Marvels #4
 1995 Black Lightning #5
 1996 Astro City #1
 1997 Astro City #10

Favorite Single-Issue Story (about one standard issue in length) 
 1998 Another Cold Morning, Transmetropolitan #8

Best Story Arc 
 1992 The Sandman #35-37 ("A Game of You")
 1993 The Sandman #51-56 ("Worlds' End")
 1994 Valor #22-23, Legion of Super-Heroes #60-61, Legionnaires #17-18 ("End of an Era")
 1995 The Sandman ("The Wake")
 1996 tie:
 Astro City #2-3 ("Everyday Lives"/"Adventures in Other Worlds")
 Captain America #450-453 ("Man Without a Country")
 1997 Astro City #5-9 ("Confession")

Favorite Serialized Story (continued from issue to issue or otherwise longer than one standard issue in length) 
 1998 Sonovawitch, Wolff & Byrd, Counselors of the Macabre #17-19

Favorite Comic-Book Work for All Ages 
 1998 Batman: Gotham Adventures

Best Graphic Novel 
 1992 Star Trek: Debt of Honor
 1993 Batman/Houdini: The Devil's Workshop
 1994 Mr. Punch
 1995 Stuck Rubber Baby
 1996 Batman/Captain America
 1997 The Wizard's Tale

Favorite New Graphic Novel or Graphic Album 
 1998 Superman: Peace on Earth

Best Non-Fiction Work 
 1992 Amazing Heroes #200's Understanding Comics preview
 1993 Understanding Comics
 1994 From Hell
 1995 The Big Book of Conspiracies
 1996 Fax from Sarajevo
 1997 The Big Book of Scandal!

Best Reprint Series or Collection 
 1992 The Sandman: Season of Mists
 1993 The Complete Bone Adventures Vol. 1
 1994 Marvels deluxe hardcover
 1995 The Tale of One Bad Rat
 1996 Astro City: Life in the Big City
 1997 Kingdom Come

Favorite Reprint Graphic Novel or Graphic Album (Current Work) 
 1998 Astro City: Family Album

Favorite Reprint Graphic Novel or Graphic Album (Historical Work) 
 1998 The Plastic Man Archives, Vol. 1

Best Publication Design 
 1992 The Batman Adventures
 1993 Daredevil: Man Without Fear
 1994 Marvels
 1995 Astro City
 1996 Astro City: Life in the Big City
 1997 Acme Novelty Library

Favorite Publication Design 
 1998 Acme Novelty Library

Best Marketing Idea 
 1992 Vertigo Preview
 1993 photocopiable coupons
 1994 Legion of Super-Heroes "reboot"
 1995 Marvel 99-cent titles
 1996 DC and Marvel's Adventures-style titles
 1997 Image's black-&-white "non-line"

Best American Publication of Foreign Material 
 1992 Signal to Noise
 1993 Akira hardcover
 1994 Drawn & Quarterly
 1995 Domu: A Child's Dream
 1996 Gon
 1997 What's Michael?

Favorite American Presentation of Foreign Material 
 1998 Gon Color Spectacular (only nominee; award dropped for final ballot)

Best Publication About Comics 
 1992 Comics Buyer's Guide
 1993 Understanding Comics
 1994 Comics Buyer's Guide
 1995 Comics Buyer's Guide
 1996 Comics Buyer's Guide
 1997 Comics Buyer's Guide

Favorite Publication about Comic Strips, Comic Books, or Animation 
 1998 tie:
 Comic Book Artist
 Comics Buyer's Guide

Best Anthology 
 1992 Miracleman: Apocrypha
 1993 Negative Burn
 1994 Dark Horse Presents
 1995 Negative Burn
 1996 Batman Black and White
 1997 Negative Burn

Best Newspaper Strip 
 1992 Calvin and Hobbes
 1993 Calvin and Hobbes
 1994 Calvin and Hobbes
 1995 Calvin and Hobbes
 1996 Dilbert
 1997 For Better or For Worse

See also
Alley Award
Eagle Award
Eisner Award
Inkpot Award
Kirby Award
Shazam Award

References 
 Comic Book Awards Almanac (Hahn Library)
 Who's Who of American Comic Books, 1928–1999

External links 
 CompuServe Comics/Animation Forum

Comics awards